The following is a partial list of chapters of the Tau Epsilon Phi fraternity.  The list of active Tau Epsilon Phi chapters is followed by a list of dormant chapters.  Chapters are listed in order of their founding.  Except as otherwise noted, the schools are listed under their current names, not the names they had at the time of the chapter founding (i.e. Auburn University instead of Alabama Polytechnic Institute).

References

External links
Official website of Tau Epsilon Phi

Lists of chapters of United States student societies by society
chapters